Jose Kevin Bonilla (born September 20, 2001) is an American college soccer player who plays as a defender for the Portland Pilots.

College career 
In his first season with Portland, he only made one appearance, in a goalless draw against Loyola Marymount.

References

External links
 
 Kevin Bonilla (Jose Bonilla) at FC Dallas

2001 births
Living people
American soccer players
Association football defenders
North Texas SC players
Soccer players from Dallas
USL League One players
Portland Pilots men's soccer players